Daniel Vogel (born 26 February 1991) is a Mexican professional footballer who plays as a goalkeeper.

Career 
Vogel was born in Ciudad Victoria, Tamaulipas. He played as a striker but due to his height they decided to train him as a goalkeeper. He was trained at Tigres UANL. During the Apertura 2009 he joined the first team as third goalkeeper he was active in the under-20 team.

Vogel joined Correcaminos UAT in 2011.

In December 2017 Vogel moved to Atlético San Luis.

References

External links
 
 Ascenso MX 

1991 births
Living people
People from Ciudad Victoria
Mexican footballers
Footballers from Tamaulipas
Association football goalkeepers
Atlético San Luis footballers